Devil Island, sometimes mistakenly called Devil's Island, is an island located on the north arm of Lake Temagami, in Ontario, Canada. Keewaydin Canoe Camp is based on Devil Island, in the shadow of Devil Mountain and across from Granny Bay in the northern section of the lake.

Background
Keeywaydin, founded in 1893 is one of several camps on Lake Temagami whose focus is on wilderness canoe trips using traditional equipment such as wood canvas canoes, wannigans, and tumplines.

See also
List of islands of Lake Temagami

External links

Lake islands of Ontario
Landforms of Temagami
Landforms of Nipissing District